Darzi Kola-ye Bozorg (also Romanized as Darzī Kolā-ye Bozorg) is a village in Karipey Rural District, Lalehabad District, Babol County, Mazandaran Province, Iran. At the 2006 census, its population was 7650, in 204 families.

References 

Populated places in Babol County